Shareek 2 is a 2022  Punjabi drama film, produced under the banner of Ohri Productions, White Hill Studios & Thind Motion Films.
 This is a sequel to the 2015 film Shareek. Shareek 2 stars Jimmy Sheirgill, Dev Kharoud, and Sharan Kaur. Just like the prequel, Shareek 2 was directed by Navaniat Singh. Jimmy Sheirgill and Mukul Dev were the only actors from the prequel to star in this film. The film released on 8 July 2022. The film marked Jimmy's comeback to Punjabi Cinema after a 4 year break.

Cast

Soundtrack

References

External links
 

2022 films
Indian drama films
Punjabi-language Indian films
2022 drama films